Speedcore is a form of electronic music that is characterized by a high tempo and aggressive themes. It was created in the early to mid-1990s and the name originates from the hardcore genre as well as the high-speed tempo used. This music rarely drops below 300 beats per minute (bpm). Earlier speedcore tracks often averaged at about 250 bpm, which could be defined as terror(core), whereas some tracks exceed 1000 bpm where it becomes known as extratone.

Characteristics

Aside from the very fast tempo, which rarely drops below the 300 bpm mark, speedcore can often be distinguished from other forms of hardcore by an aggressive and overridden electronic percussion track that is often punctuated with a hyperactive snare or tom-tom fills. Most producers will overdrive their kicks so far that they become square waves. Speedcore DJs often use violent, vulgar, and offensive themes in their music to push the boundaries of the genre.

Since the 2000s, the use of digital audio workstations (DAWs) has grown versus the use of analog synthesizers or trackers.

History

Origins (1992–1993) 
Speedcore is a natural progression of hardcore techno. Hardcore was already considered fast, however, there were those who were not content to stay at the established speed. Early speedcore was about pushing the limits of bpm and aggression level. One of the first songs to explore higher speeds was "Thousand" by Moby in 1992, which peaked at approximately 1,015 bpm.

Early speedcore (1994–1999) 

The term speedcore in reference to high tempo hardcore/gabber can be traced as far back as 1995. Many believe that Disciples Of Annihilation created the name of the genre with their track N.Y.C. Speedcore and Ya Mutha II.

It was not until the early 2000s that the genre was commonly referred to as speedcore. Before then, many tracks that would be considered speedcore were referred to as "gabba".

Spread (early 2000s) 
The early 2000s saw the birth of many netlabels dedicated to speedcore. Many labels who produced vinyls were also publishing mp3s on their websites, which became increasingly popular and made it easier for new producers to enter the scene.

Internet growth (2010s) 
The 2010s had a large growth in netlabels. DAWs made it cheaper and easier for new musicians to make experimental music. The internet allowed producers from around the world to communicate with each other and share their works through netlabels. Compilation albums became very popular for artists to share their music as they could get more exposure than by themselves. A large portion of the speedcore scene now occurs online from netlabels to speedcore promotion channels on YouTube. Speedcore was no longer restrained to localized areas by where raves occurred and vinyls were released.

Subgenres

Splittercore
Speedcore is often called splittercore when the bpm is between 600 and 1,000. Splittercore is identified by its minigun sounding kicks. In the 1990s splittercore was sometimes referred to as nosebleed Techno.

Flashcore 
Flashcore is a genre that grew out of speedcore and industrial hardcore. While being originally related to speedcore, flashcore is defined by its complex avant-garde structures and abstract sounds, making it more similar to electroacoustic music and experimental music rather than any EDM genre. Most of the genre's works focus on intense, rhythmic, and layered soundscapes.

Extratone 
Songs with a bpm of 1000 or higher are known as extratone songs. At this tempo, the kicks happen so fast that the beat sounds like one constant note with a shifting pitch; extratone often has sudden increases or decreases in tempo to change the pitch of the tone. Extratone originates from combining the two German words extrahieren (to extract) and ton (sound).

See also 
 List of electronic music genres

References

20th-century music genres
Hardcore music genres